Rockstar Lincoln Limited (formerly Spidersoft Limited and Tarantula Studios) is a British video game developer based in Lincoln. It is the quality assurance and localisation studio of Rockstar Games. Steve Marsden and David Cooke founded the company as Spidersoft in May 1992. Initially, it primarily developed Game Boy and Game Gear ports of various titles, including pinball video games for publisher 21st Century Entertainment, which acquired Spidersoft in 1995. After 21st Century Entertainment shut down in March 1998, Take-Two Interactive acquired Spidersoft in June that year and renamed it Tarantula Studios. The studio continued working on Game Boy and Game Boy Color games, such as Grand Theft Auto (1999). In 2002, the development portion of Tarantula Studios was shut down and the quality assurance portion was integrated into Take-Two's Rockstar Games label as Rockstar Lincoln.

History

Early years and pinball games (1992–1998) 
Rockstar Lincoln was founded as Spidersoft by Steve Marsden and David Cooke. They had previously worked together in the computer chip manufacturing department of GEC-Marconi from 1982 until 1984, when they turned to game development. They created the ZX Spectrum game Technician Ted, which was published by Andrew Hewson's company Hewson Consultants in 1984. The duo ported the game Speedball 2: Brutal Deluxe to the Game Boy while working with Mirrorsoft in 1991 and created a coin-op conversion of Time Scanner, a pinball video game, for Activision. Hewson shut down Hewson Consultants and co-founded 21st Century Entertainment in 1991. Following a meeting between him and Marsden, Marsden and Cooke established Spidersoft on 5 May 1992. The founders intended to name the company after an insect but found "Bugsoft" inappropriate. As arachnids "spooked them most", they settled on "Spidersoft". Marsden initially intended to keep tropical fish at the office but found that this would have required regularly cleaning their tanks. Instead, and in line with its name, the studio adopted tarantulas, starting with a Goliath birdeater and peaking at fifteen specimens. The studio primarily developed ports or adaptations of other games, including pinball games developed by Digital Illusions and published by 21st Century Entertainment. These include Pinball Dreams, which Spidersoft worked on for six to seven months. The studio also developed a sequel, Pinball Dreams 2, in five months. Outside of pinball projects, Hewson set up the studio with Sony Imagesoft to develop Cliffhanger, a tie-in for the 1993 film of the same name. Poker Face Paul's Blackjack and Solitaire were each completed in twenty-five days.

21st Century Entertainment contracted Spidersoft to port the successful game Pinball Fantasies to a range of platforms, including the Atari Jaguar and Game Boy. Following these ports' 1995 releases, 21st Century Entertainment sought to ensure a steady supply of pinball games without having to rely on third-party contractors, aiming at topping the pinball game niche market. To Hewson, Spidersoft appeared willing to continue developing pinball games, whereas Digital Illusions was looking to drop out of developing games in the genre. Consequently, 21st Century Entertainment acquired a controlling stake in Spidersoft. As the publisher increasingly focused on pinball games, Hewson lost his passion for the business, which he felt became "formulaic". In 1997, he was offered to join a start-up founded by old contacts of his, so he agreed with his co-investors to part ways and wind down the company. 21st Century Entertainment was defunct by March 1998.

Acquisition and handheld games (1998–2000) 
On 1 June 1998, Take-Two Interactive announced its acquisition Spidersoft, renaming it Tarantula Studios. As part of the deal, the studio shifted its focus to game development for the Game Boy and Game Boy Color, starting with Montezuma's Return!, In-Fisherman Bass Hunter, and an unannounced project for the former platform, as well as Three Lions and Space Station Silicon Valley for the latter. Marsden remained with Tarantula Studios as studio director. In October 1999, the studio employed twenty-four development staff and was in the process of hiring fifteen people for quality assurance. It also held five tarantulas at this time, residing in Marsden's office. Tarantula Studios developed multiple games concurrently, each with a team of two programmers and two artists. Later games by Tarantula Studios include Rats! (1998) and Jim Henson's Muppets (1999), as well as Evel Knievel (1999), Grand Theft Auto (1999), Grand Theft Auto 2 (2000), Austin Powers: Welcome to My Underground Lair! (2000), and Austin Powers: Oh, Behave! (2000) published by Take-Two's Rockstar Games label. Evel Knievel became the lowest-scored Game Boy Color game on IGN at 2.0/10, with the site's writers describing it as "ruthlessly hard and impossible to play".

Transition to quality assurance (2001–present) 
By 2001, the development and quality assurance departments of Tarantula Studios had been separated, of which the former was shut down in 2002. The remainder was integrated into Rockstar Games as Rockstar Lincoln in the same year. As part of Rockstar Games, the studio provides quality assurance and localisations—including French, German, Italian, Japanese, Russian, and Spanish—for internal projects, such as Manhunt, Max Payne 2, and the Grand Theft Auto series. In January 2011, Mark Lloyd, Rockstar Lincoln's long-time studio head who had been with the company since 1999, announced his resignation. His departure coincided with that of Mark Washbrook, the founder and studio head of Rockstar London. Rockstar Games stated that neither departure would affect the studios' active projects. Tim Bates succeeded Lloyd as general manager. Lloyd went on to found a video game consultancy service, Titanium Consultancy, which he later voluntarily wound down. Alongside Washbrook, he joined Activision's mobile-focused Activision Leeds studio in May 2012. Rockstar Lincoln won the "Active Workplace" award in the Lincolnshire Sports Awards in 2015 and 2016, and was nominated again in 2017. The studio offered its employees subsidised gym memberships, and a "Sports & Social" team organised sporting and leisure activities.

Leading up to the release of Red Dead Redemption 2 in October 2018, it was reported that Rockstar Lincoln staff had, of all other Rockstar Games studios, suffered the worst crunch. Former and active employees reported that testers were paid low wages, had to work long hours, and were subjected to strict security regulations. One employee stated that mandatory overtime for working on Red Dead Redemption 2 started in August 2017, prior to Rockstar Games entering "official crunch mode" that October. Testers at Rockstar Lincoln were asked to work on evenings and weekends. They would initially work three nights per week, and later five. Of those working overtime, localisers and lead testers were paid annual salaries and thus were not compensated for working additional hours. In contrast, regular testers were paid by the hour and, depending on how long they worked, earned more than their leads. In response to overtime reports, the studio's management announced in a meeting held on 19 October 2018 that overtime at the studio would immediately become optional. All testers at the studio were to be converted to full-time employees by 1 August 2019. Security measures were lowered to allow mobile phones at the workplace, and a flexitime system was introduced.

Games developed

As Spidersoft

As Tarantula Studios

Cancelled 
 In-Fisherman Bass Hunter

References

Bibliography 
 

1992 establishments in England
1995 mergers and acquisitions
1998 mergers and acquisitions
British companies established in 1992
British subsidiaries of foreign companies
Companies based in Lincoln, England
Rockstar Games subsidiaries
Take-Two Interactive divisions and subsidiaries
Video game companies established in 1992
Video game companies of the United Kingdom
Video game development companies